The National Forest Scenic Byways are roads that have been designated by the U.S. Forest Service as scenic byways. Many are also National Scenic Byways (NSB). The program was initiated in 1987.


List
The following roadways were listed by the Federal Highway Administration as National Forest Scenic Byways as of August 2013:

See also

References

External links
 

 01
National Forest
Scenic Byway